Tom Singh  (born August 1949) is the founder of the New Look, a chain of high street fashion stores in the United Kingdom.

Early life
Singh was born into a Punjabi Sikh family, who emigrated from the Punjab to England in the late 1940s  when he was a baby. He was educated at Wellington School. He earned a degree in international politics and geography from the University of Wales, Aberystwyth.

Career
In 1969, Singh founded the UK fashion retail chain New Look in Taunton, Somerset, starting with a loan from his parents of £5,000.

In 2019, his net worth was estimated at £340 million by The Sunday Times Rich List.

In June 2019, Singh announced his departure from New Look.

In 2020, Singh invested in Love the Sales, an online marketplace for discounted clothes.

Honours
He was appointed an OBE in the New Year's Honours List December 2006.

Philanthropy
He is also the principal of Rianta Philanthropy, an India-focused impact investing fund that operates the Artha Platform, an investor network.

Personal life
He is married to Kuljit Singh. They live in Weymouth, Dorset. He is the eldest brother of author and broadcaster Simon Singh.

References

1949 births
English businesspeople in fashion
English Sikhs
Alumni of Aberystwyth University
Living people
Punjabi people
People educated at Wellington School, Somerset
Officers of the Order of the British Empire
British company founders
English people of Punjabi descent